Heyden may refer to:

Places 
 Germany
 Heyden Power Station, nearby Petershagen in Germany

 Canada
 Heyden, Ontario, a community of Awares, Ontario

People 
 Carl von Heyden (1793-1866), German senator and entomologist
 Doris Heyden (1905–2005), scholar of pre-Columbian Mesoamerican cultures
 Karl von der Heyden, Vice Chairman of the Board of Directors of PepsiCo, Inc.
 Lucas Friedrich Julius Dominikus von Heyden (1838-1915), German entomologist
 Philipp Heyden (born 1988), German basketball player
 Sebald Heyden (1499–1561), German musicologist, educator and hymn writer
 Wilhelm von Heyden-Cadow (1839-1920), Prussian politician, agriculture minister

See also 
 Michel Heydens, a Belgian racecar driver
 Felix von Heijden (1890-1982), Dutch footballer
 Van der Heijden, Dutch surname
 Van der Heyden, Dutch surname
 Heiden (disambiguation)
 Haiden (disambiguation)
 Haden (disambiguation)
 Hayden (disambiguation)
 Haydn (disambiguation)
 Haydon (disambiguation)
 Heydon (disambiguation)